Adolf Wagner (23 July 1911 – 9 June 1984) was a German weightlifter who competed in the 1936 Summer Olympics and won a bronze medal in middleweight category. He lifted a total of 352.5 kg (clean and press - 97.5 kg, snatch - 112.5 kg, clean & jerk - 142.5 kg) at bodyweight  of 74 kg. He was a member of the club He also won the gold medal in the 1938 World weightlifting championships. VKSA Essen 88.

References

Adolf Wagner's profile at Sports Reference.com

1911 births
1984 deaths
German male weightlifters
Weightlifters at the 1936 Summer Olympics
Olympic bronze medalists for Germany
Olympic medalists in weightlifting
Olympic weightlifters of Germany
Medalists at the 1936 Summer Olympics